was a Japanese statesman and diplomat.

Early life
Komura was born to a lower-ranking samurai family in the service of the Obi Domain in Kyushu's Hyūga Province (now Nichinan, Miyazaki Prefecture). He attended the Daigaku Nankō, the predecessor of Tokyo Imperial University. In 1875, he was selected by the Ministry of Education as one of the first students to study abroad under a government scholarship. At Harvard University, Komura shared lodgings with the fellow Japanese student Kaneko Kentarō. In due course, Komura graduated from Harvard Law School in 1878.

Career

In 1880, Komura joined the Ministry of Justice and, after serving as a judge of the Supreme Court of Japan, transferred in 1884 to the Translation Bureau in the Ministry of Foreign Affairs.

In 1893, Komura was the chargé d'affaires at the Japanese legation in Beijing, in Qing dynasty China. In that position, he conveyed to the Chinese government Japan's intention of dispatching troops to Korea under the provisions of the Treaty of Tientsin to subdue the Tonghak Rebellion, which led to the First Sino-Japanese War. During the war, Komura was appointed as civilian administrator for territories Japan had captured in Manchuria. He was also a key figure in the negotiations to end the war, culminating in the Treaty of Shimonoseki, which he helped to draft.

Following the assassination of Queen Min of Korea, Komura was dispatched to replace Miura Gorō as the Japanese minister to Korea. In his position as resident minister in Korea, he negotiated the Komura-Weber Memorandum in May 1896 with his Russian counterpart, Karl Ivanovich Weber, to allow joint interference in Korean internal affairs by the Japanese and the Russian Empires.

Komura served as Vice Minister for Foreign Affairs until September 1898, when he was named ambassador to Washington, D.C.

In September 1901, Komura became Minister for Foreign Affairs under the first Katsura administration, and he signed the Boxer Protocol on behalf of Japan. He was elevated into the kazoku peerage with the title of baron (danshaku) in 1902 and decorated with the 1st class of the Order of the Rising Sun.

In 1902, Komura helped to conclude the Anglo-Japanese Alliance in 1902. His tenure as foreign minister was marked with increasing tension between Japan and Russia over Korea and Manchuria, which cumulated in the Russo-Japanese War in 1904–1905.

 After the withdrawal of Russian forces in the region, Russian diplomats Witte and Rosen and their Japanese colleagues Takahira Ochiai, Komura, and others met in Portsmouth to sign the peace treaty. During the negotiations, Witte tried to keep Russia's rights on the southern part of Sakhalin island, referring to the Treaty of Saint Petersburg (1875), which gave the Kuril Islands to Japan in exchange for Russian rights in Sakhalin, but Komura declared that "war cancels all treaties."

The war was ended with Komura's signature on behalf of the Japanese government of the Treaty of Portsmouth, which was highly unpopular in Japan and led to the Hibiya incendiary incident.

Komura also met with E. H. Harriman, the American railway magnate, to propose a joint venture between Harriman's conglomerate and Japan towards the development of the South Manchuria Railway. On his return to Japan, he found that the agreement was opposed by the genrō and so it was not implemented.

Komura also met with Chinese representatives in Beijing and signed the Peking Treaty of December 1905, which transferred the former Russian rights in southern Manchuria to Japan.

For those services, Komura was awarded the Order of the Paulownia Flowers in 1906 and was appointed to become a member of the Privy Council.

From June 1906 to August 1908, Komura served as ambassador to Britain and was made a Knight Commander of the Order of the Bath by King Edward VII and a member of the Royal Victorian Order. On his return to Tokyo, he resumed the post of foreign minister in the second Katsura administration and signed the Root–Takahira Agreement with the United States. His peerage title was also elevated to that of Count ("hakushaku") in 1907.

Komura also played a key role in the Japan-Korea Annexation Treaty in 1910 and in concluding various international agreements in 1911 to restore Japan's tariff autonomy. He was elevated to the title of Marquis ("koshaku") on April 21, 1911.

Suffering from tuberculosis in his final years, Komura moved to the seaside resort of Hayama in Kanagawa Prefecture, but he died of the disease on November 26, 1911. His grave is at Aoyama Cemetery, Tokyo.

In popular culture
In Ryōtarō Shiba's semi-historical work Saka no Ue no Kumo, Komura inherited massive debts from his father, which he had difficulty with repayment. As a result, he wore the same frayed frock coat for years, regardless of season or occasion. That, combined with his short stature and a large mustache, led to the derisive nickname of "the rat minister" in the diplomatic community in his early career. In the Japanese Taiga drama adaptation of Shiba’s work, the role of Komura is played by actor Naoto Takenaka.

Honors
From the article in the Japanese Wikipedia

Peerages
Baron - 7 February 1902
Count - 21 September 1907
Marquess - 21 April 1911

Decorations and ranks
Order of the Sacred Treasure, Third Class (31 October 1895)
Grand Cordon of the Order of the Rising Sun  (27 February 1902; Second Class: 21 October 1899)
Hon. Knight Grand Cross of the Order of St Michael and St George (GCMG) - 8 July 1905.
Grand Cordon of the Order of the Paulownia Flowers - 1 April 1906
Hon. Knight Grand Cross of the Order of the Bath (GCB) - 1907.
Hon. Knight Grand Cross of the Royal Victorian Order (GCVO) - 7 May 1907.
Second degree in the official order of precedence - 26 November 1911 (posthumous)

An International Center Komura Memorial Hall was built in Nichinan, Miyazaki on the former Obi domain of the Komura family in honour of Komura Jutarō and his accomplishments in Japan foreign relations expansion. This memorial and museum is presented on the web site of the Ministry of Land, Infrastructure, Transport and Tourism for the island of Kyūshū.

See also
 List of Ambassadors from Japan to South Korea

References

Further reading
 Davis, Richard Harding, and Alfred Thayer Mahan. (1905).  The Russo-Japanese war; a photographic and descriptive review of the great conflict in the Far East, gathered from the reports, records, cable despatches, photographs, etc., etc., of Collier's war correspondents  New York: P. F. Collier & Son.  OCLC: 21581015
 Beasley, W.G. Japanese Imperialism 1894-1945. Oxford University Press. 
 Kanayama, Nobuo. Komura Jutaro to Potsumasu: Roshia ni "gaiko" de katta otoko. PHP Kenkyujo (1984).  (Japanese)
 Korostovetz, J.J. (1920).  Pre-War Diplomacy The Russo-Japanese Problem. London: British Periodicals Limited.
 MacMurray, John Van Antwerp. (1921).  Treaties and Agreements with and Concerning China, 1894-1919: A Collection. Oxford: Oxford University Press.
 Morris, Edmund. Theodore Rex. Modern Library; Reprint edition (2002). 
 
 Paine, S.C.M. The Sino-Japanese War of 1894-1895: Perception, Power, and Primacy, 2003,  Cambridge University Press, Cambridge, MA, 412 pp.

External links

 National Diet Library, Portraits of Modern Japanese Historical Figures, Komura Juntaro
 Yomiuri Shimbun:  >15% of primary school students in Japan confused Takayoshi Kido with Komura or Toshimichi Ōkubo , 2008.
 The Museum Meiji Mura
 Hisahiko Okazaki, Komura Jutaro and His Age, 2011 (e-book)

1855 births
1911 deaths
People from Miyazaki Prefecture
University of Tokyo alumni
People of Meiji-period Japan
Harvard Law School alumni
Ambassadors of Japan to the United Kingdom
Japanese people of the Boxer Rebellion
People of the First Sino-Japanese War
Japanese people of the Russo-Japanese War
Kazoku
Grand Cordons of the Order of the Rising Sun
Honorary Knights Grand Cross of the Order of the Bath
Honorary Knights Grand Cross of the Royal Victorian Order
Honorary Knights Grand Cross of the Order of St Michael and St George
Recipients of the Order of the Paulownia Flowers
20th-century deaths from tuberculosis
Tuberculosis deaths in Japan
Ambassadors of Japan to the United States
Foreign ministers of Japan
Recipients of the Order of the Plum Blossom
Harvard College alumni